Antonella Cupillari (born 1955) is an Italian-American mathematician interested in the history of mathematics and mathematics education. She is an associate professor of mathematics at Penn State Erie, The Behrend College.

Education and career
Cupillari earned a laurea at the University of L'Aquila in 1978, and completed her Ph.D. at the University at Albany, SUNY in 1984.

Cupillari joined the faculty at Penn State Erie in 1984 and was promoted to associate professor in 1992.

Books
Cupillari is the author of books on mathematics and the history of mathematics including:
The Nuts and Bolts of Proofs (Wadsworth, 1989; 2nd & 3rd eds., Harcourt/Academic Press, 2000 & 2005; 4th ed., Academic Press, 2011)
Intermediate Algebra in Action (PWS Publishing, 1995)
A Biography of Maria Gaetana Agnesi, an Eighteenth-Century Woman Mathematician: With Translations of Some of Her Work from Italian into English (Edwin Mellen Press, 2007)

Recognition
Cupillari was the 2008 winner of the Award for Distinguished College or University Teaching of Mathematics of the Allegheny Mountain Section of the Mathematical Association of America.

References

External links
Home page

1955 births
Living people
Italian mathematicians
Italian women mathematicians
20th-century American mathematicians
21st-century American mathematicians
American women mathematicians
Mathematics educators
American historians of mathematics
University at Albany, SUNY alumni
Pennsylvania State University faculty
Penn State Erie, The Behrend College
20th-century American women
21st-century American women